Red Dawn is a 1984 American action drama film directed by John Milius with a screenplay by Milius and Kevin Reynolds. The film depicts a fictional World War III centering on a land invasion of the continental United States by an alliance of Soviet, Warsaw Pact and Latin American states. The story follows a group of teenaged guerillas, known as the Wolverines, in Soviet-occupied Colorado. The film stars Patrick Swayze, Charlie Sheen, C. Thomas Howell, Lea Thompson and Jennifer Grey, with supporting roles played by Ben Johnson, Harry Dean Stanton, Ron O'Neal, William Smith and Powers Boothe.

Despite mixed reviews from critics, the film became a commercial success, grossing $38 million against a budget of $17 million. It was the first film to be released in the U.S. with a PG-13 rating (under the modified rating system introduced on July 1, 1984). A remake was released in 2012.

Plot 

In an alternate 1980s, the United States of America is strategically isolated after NATO is disbanded. At the same time, the Soviet Union and its Warsaw Pact allies aggressively expand. In addition, the Ukrainian wheat harvest fails while a socialist coup d'état occurs in Mexico.

In September, in the town of Calumet, Colorado, a local high school teacher pauses upon seeing Soviet troops parachuting from An-12 transport aircraft. He walks outside to question them and they open fire, killing the teacher and several students. Pandemonium follows as students flee amid heavy gunfire. Jed Eckert, who had dropped his brother Matt off at the high school, returns to pick up him and several of their friends, narrowly escaping the chaos.

In downtown Calumet, Cuban, Nicaraguan, and Soviet troops begin imposing order after a hasty occupation. Cuban Colonel Ernesto Bella instructs the KGB to go to the local sporting goods stores and obtain the records of the store's gun sales, the ATF Form 4473, to determine who owns firearms in Calumet and in the surrounding rural area.

Brothers Jed and Matt Eckert, along with their friends Robert Morris, Danny, Daryl Bates, and Arturo "Aardvark" Mondragon, flee into the wilderness after hastily equipping themselves at a gas station general store owned by Robert's father. At one point they encounter a Soviet roadblock, but are saved by a U.S. Army UH-1 helicopter gunship. After several weeks in the forest, they learn that Jed and Matt's father is being held in a "re-education camp" at the town's drive-in movie theater. They visit the camp, speaking to Mr. Eckert through the fence, and learn that their mother is dead; Mr. Eckert reminds them he had purposely raised them in a strenuous manner, ordering them to avenge him.

The kids visit the Masons, behind enemy lines in "occupied America" where they learn Robert's father was executed for "aiding guerillas" (providing guns to the boys from his store). The Masons ask Jed and Matt to take care of their granddaughters, Toni and Erica. After killing Soviet soldiers in the woods, the youths begin attacking the occupation forces, calling themselves "Wolverines" after the school mascot. The Soviets respond with reprisals, executing groups of civilians following every Wolverine attack. The fathers of Jed, Matt, and Aardvark are killed in one of these executions. Daryl's father, Mayor Bates, tries to save the lives of the captured citizens by collaborating, but with little success. The reprisal tactics do not deter the Wolverines.

The Wolverines meet American F-15 fighter pilot Lt. Col. Andrew Tanner, shot down by a Soviet Red Air Force MiG-23 after shooting down a number of the other MiGs in the strike force, headed for Denver. He informs them of the current state of the war: several American cities, including Washington D.C., were destroyed by nuclear strikes, Strategic Air Command was crippled by Cuban saboteurs, and paratroopers were dropped from airliners to seize key positions in preparation for the main assaults via Mexico and Alaska. Most of the southern United States and Northwestern Canada are occupied by the Soviets, but American counterattacks have halted Soviet advances along the Rockies and the Mississippi, and the lines have now stabilized. America's only foreign allies—China and the United Kingdom—remain active against the Soviets, but are militarily crippled.

Tanner assists the Wolverines in organizing raids. This draws the attention of Soviet General Bratchenko, who orders further reprisals against the civilian population. The Wolverines' actions, and the reprisals lead to the high command on both sides of the war to know the name "Wolverines", and the Soviet generals publicly state that the area "may not be pacified for much longer". Soon after, visiting the front line, Tanner and Aardvark are killed in the crossfire of a tank battle. Daryl is caught by the KGB after his father informs them that he has come into town. After torturing him, the KGB force-feeds Daryl a tracking device, and release him to rejoin the guerrillas. A Spetsnaz unit is sent into the mountains carrying portable radio triangulation equipment, but are ambushed by the Wolverines. The group traces the source of the signal to Daryl, who confesses, pleading for mercy. He is executed by a hardened Robert after Jed executes a Spetsnaz operative as the others cannot kill their friend.

The remaining Wolverines are ambushed by Mi-24 helicopter gunships, and Toni and Robert are killed. Jed and Matt attack the Soviet headquarters in Calumet to distract the troops while Danny and Erica escape. The plan works, but both Jed and Matt are mortally wounded. Colonel Bella soon finds Jed carrying a wounded Matt and holds him at gunpoint. Despite being enemies, Bella lets the boys go as he is unwilling to murder children. The brothers reach a bench in the park, holding each other as they die. Meanwhile, Danny and Erica trek through the Rocky Mountain Wilderness, reaching the frontier of Free America.

In the closing scene, a plaque is seen with Partisan Rock in the background. It is fenced off and an American flag flies nearby implying that the United States won the war. The plaque reads:... In the early days of World War III, guerrillas – mostly children – placed the names of their lost upon this rock. They fought here alone and gave up their lives, so "that this nation shall not perish from the earth."

Cast

Production

Ten Soldiers 
Originally called Ten Soldiers, it was written by Kevin Reynolds. It was set in the near future as a combined force of Russians and Cubans launched an invasion of the Southwestern U.S.. Ten children take to the hills when their small town is captured, turning into a skilled and lethal guerrilla band.

Producer Barry Beckerman read the script, and, in the words of Peter Bart, "thought it had the potential to become a tough, taut, 'art' picture made on a modest budget that could possibly break out to find a wider audience." His father Sidney Beckerman helped him pay a $5,000 option. Reynolds wanted to direct but the Beckermans wanted someone more established. Walter Hill briefly considered the script before turning it down, as did several other directors.

The Beckermans pitched the project to David Begelman at MGM, but were turned down. They tried again at that studio when it was run by Frank Yablans. Senior vice-president for production Peter Bart, who remembers it as a "sharply written anti-war movie ... a sort of Lord of the Flies", took the project to Yablans.

The script's chances increased when Reynolds became mentored by Steven Spielberg, who helped him make Fandango. MGM bought the script.
The film depicts a group of high school students who engage in guerrilla warfare against troops of Cuba, Nicaragua and the Soviet Union who have invaded the United States.

John Milius 
Bart recalls that things changed when "the chieftains at MGM got a better idea. Instead of making a poignant little antiwar movie, why not make a teen Rambo and turn the project over to John Milius, a genial filmmaker who loved war movies. The idea was especially popular with a member of the MGM board of directors, General Alexander Haig, the former Nixon chief of staff, who yearned to supervise the film personally and develop a movie career."

Bart says most of MGM's executives, except for Yablans, were opposed to Milius directing. Bart claims he made a last minute attempt to get Reynolds to direct the film and went to see Spielberg. However, by this stage Fandango was in rough cut, and Bart sensed that Spielberg was disappointed in the film and would not speak up for Reynolds. Milius was signed to direct at a fee of $1.25 million, plus a gun of his choice.

Milius set about rewriting the script. He and Haig devised a backstory in which the circumstances of the invasion would occur; this was reportedly based on Hitler's proposed plans to invade the U.S. during World War II. Haig took Milius under his wing, bringing him to the Hudson Institute, the conservative think tank founded by Herman Kahn, to develop a plausible scenario. Milius saw the story as a Third World liberation struggle in reverse; Haig introduced Nicaragua and suggested that, with the collapse of NATO, a left-wing Mexican government would participate in the Soviet invasion, effectively splitting the U.S. in half. Bart says, "Even Milius was taken aback by Haig's approach to the project. 'This is going to end up as a jingoistic, flag-waving movie,' Milius fretted. As a result, the budget of this once $6 million movie almost tripled."

Other changes included a shift in focus from conflict within the group to conflict between the teens and their oppressors, and the acceleration of the ages of some of the characters from early teens to high school age and beyond. There was also the addition of a sequence where some children visit a camp to find their parents have been brainwashed.

Milius later said, "I see this as an anti-war movie in the sense that if both sides could see this, maybe it wouldn't have to happen. I think it would be good for Americans to see what a war would be like. The film isn't even that violent – the war shows none of the horrors that could happen in World War III. In fact, everything that happened in the movie happened in World War II."

Bart says Yablans pushed through filming faster than Milius wanted because MGM needed a movie over the summer. Milius wanted more time to plan, including devising futuristic weaponry and to not shoot over winter, but had to accede.

Casting 
Milius wanted Robert Blake to play the US pilot but Frank Yablans overruled him. Powers Boothe was selected instead.

Filming 
The movie was filmed in and around the city of Las Vegas, New Mexico. Many of the buildings and structures which appear in the film, including a historic Fred Harvey Company hotel adjacent to the train depot, the train yard, and a building near downtown, which was repainted with the name of "Calumet, Colorado", referencing the town in Michigan, are still there today. An old Safeway grocery store was converted to a sound stage and used for several scenes in the movie.

Before starting work on the movie, the cast underwent an intensive eight-week military training course. During that time, production crews designed and built special combat vehicles in Newhall, California. Soldier of Fortune reported that the movie's T-72 tank was such a precise replica that "while it was being carted around Los Angeles, two CIA intelligence officers followed it to the studio and wanted to know where it had come from".

Powers Boothe later claimed that "Milius cut out the emotional life of its characters. Originally, my character was anti-war, as well as a rightist. I was supposed to be the voice of reason in that movie. But certain cuts negated my character."

Lea Thompson said the original cut featured a love scene between her and Powers Boothe but it "was cut out after some previews because of the age difference. And that was the main reason I took the movie—it was such a terrific scene."

Some of the weaponry devised for the film did not work. Futuristic helicopters created for the film did not have FAA approval to fly over people.

The budget increased from $11 million to $15 million. It eventually came in at $19 million.

Music 
The film's score was composed and conducted by Basil Poledouris; it was the first soundtrack album to be released (on LP and compact disc) by Intrada Records. The label issued the complete score in 2007.

Reception

Box office 
Red Dawn was the 20th highest-grossing film of 1984, opening on August 10, 1984 in 1,822 theatres and taking in $8,230,381 on its first weekend. Its box office gross is $38,376,497.

Critical reaction 
Red Dawn received mixed reviews, receiving a "Rotten" 52% rating on Rotten Tomatoes based on 27 reviews, with an average rating of 5.6/10. The website's consensus reads, "An appealing ensemble of young stars will have some audiences rooting for the Wolverines, but Red Dawns self-seriousness can never conceal the silliness of its alarmist concept."

Colin Greenland reviewed Red Dawn for Imagine magazine, and stated that "Red Dawn [...] is a self-congratulatory little B-picture, the sort America does so well. Set in the early months of World War Three, it's a loving chronicle of juvenile heroism in Russian-occupied Colorado. Schoolkids caught behind enemy lines become crack guerillas overnight. Slaughter nobly, die even more so. Nice scenery, shame about the movie."

The New York Times reviewer Janet Maslin said, "To any sniveling lily-livers who suppose that John Milius ... has already reached the pinnacle of movie-making machismo, a warning: Mr. Milius's Red Dawn is more rip-roaring than anything he has done before. Here is Mr. Milius at his most alarming, delivering a rootin'-tootin' scenario for World War III."

MGM apologized to Alaska war veterans for the film's advertising, which claimed that no foreign troops had ever landed on U.S. soil, overlooking the Aleutian Islands campaign of World War II, where Japanese soldiers occupied the Aleutian Islands, part of Alaska.

At the time it was released, Red Dawn was considered the most violent film by the Guinness Book of Records and the National Coalition on Television Violence, with a rate of 134 acts of violence per hour, or 2.23 per minute. The 2007 DVD Special Edition includes an on-screen "Carnage Counter" in a nod to this.

A few days after the NCTV survey came out, 35 protestors picketed the MGM/UA building in opposition to the film. John Milius said:
What these people really don't like is that the movie shows violence being perpetrated against Russian and Cuban invaders, which is what the demonstration was all about. My question is, where were all these demonstrators when the Russians shot down that airliner? Were they cheering? And what about the people being gassed and yellow-rained in Afghanistan? ... There's really no pleasure in outraging these people. I suppose next some extreme right-wing organization will give me an award, which is equally ridiculous.

Later reputation 
National Review Online has named the film No. 15 in its list of the "Best Conservative Movies." Adam Arseneau at the website DVD Verdict opined that the film "often feels like a Republican wet dream manifested into a surrealistic Orwellian nightmare".

According to Jesse Walker of Reason,

Libertarian theorist Murray Rothbard argued that the film was "not so much pro-war as it is anti-state." Rothbard gave the film a generally positive review, while expressing some reservations with the story:

Ed Power writes for The Independent,

Home media 
Red Dawn has been variously released across a variety of formats.
 In 1985, Red Dawn released on VHS. It was also released at the same time on PAL and Betamax.
 Also in 1985, Red Dawn released on LaserDisc . The film was released several times on this format, with the latest in April 1994.
 In 1998, Red Dawn released on DVD.
 In 2007, a two-disc DVD Collector's Edition was released. Unusual among the "extras" are interviews of residents recalling the filming of the movie.
 In 2015, a DVD release featured Red Dawn with the 2012 remake. Another release the same year excluded the remake.
 In 2017, the Collector's Edition was released on Blu-ray.
 In 2022, Shout! Factory released Red Dawn on 4K Ultra HD Blu-Ray.

References in the film 
The movie being shown to American prisoners at the re-education camp is Sergei Eisenstein's Alexander Nevsky (1938).

Much of the story is set in the Arapaho National Forest, and a group of Soviet soldiers refer to the Colorado War, which was fought there between the Arapaho and Cheyenne tribes and the U.S. government.

During one scene, the young freedom fighters sit and listen to a radio playing messages meant for guerillas behind the lines. The message played, "John has a long mustache.", is one of the messages that was used before D-Day in Normandy to signal French partisans of the imminent invasion.  The broadcast of this message is dramatized in the 1962 film The Longest Day.

Operation Red Dawn 

The operation to capture former Iraqi dictator Saddam Hussein was named Operation Red Dawn and its targets were dubbed "Wolverine 1" and "Wolverine 2". Army Captain Geoffrey McMurray, who named the mission, said the naming "was so fitting because it was a patriotic, pro-American movie." Milius approved of the naming, saying "I was deeply flattered and honored. It's nice to have a lasting legacy."

Cultural influence 
Red Dawn has been referenced by and influenced a number of other mediums including music, books, film, and video games.
Following the Russian invasion of Ukraine 'Wolverines' graffiti was reported on a destroyed Russian APC.

Books, film and television 
 Numerous references occur in the movie Hot Tub Time Machine, including the movie playing in the Ski Patrol station and being watched by Blaine, who considers it one of the best movies of all time.
 "Grey Dawn" is a South Park episode which parodies Red Dawn where the old people of the town, fed up with how they are treated, take over the quiet Colorado town.
 The 2017 American military drama series SEAL Team episode "Rolling Dark" contains numerous references to Red Dawn, such as a scene where one of the SEALs raises his weapon and yells "Wolverines!" to his Russian pursuers, a reference to a scene from the film. The SEAL then states "don't tell me y'all never seen Red Dawn before."

Music 
 Rock musician David Rosenthal formed the prog rock group Red Dawn in 1992 with drummer Chuck Burgi and bassist Greg Smith.

Video games 
Red Dawn has influenced a number of video games.
 Freedom Fighters is a 2003 video game that takes place during a Soviet invasion of New York. This game is heavily influenced by Red Dawn'''s characters, costumes, and design. The game's last mission closely resembles one of the movie's final scenes, when the Wolverines attack the Soviet base.
 The plot of Call of Duty: Modern Warfare 2 includes an invasion of the United States by an ultra-nationalist Russia, where members of the United States Army's 75th Ranger Regiment have to repel the attack. The achievement "Red Dawn" is awarded for completing the American "Wolverines!" and "Exodus" missions in Veteran difficulty. "Wolverines!" itself is a reference to the movie.
 Homefront, a video game also written by John Milius about a reunited Korean invasion of America, borrows heavily from the movie. One notable Easter egg relating to the film is a large billboard at a school sport stadium which reads "Go Wolverines!!!". In turn, the plot of the 2012 remake of Red Dawn borrows heavily from Homefront, including the use of a united Korean threat, the use of rural and suburban settings for the primary action, and partisan warfare.
The video game Grand Theft Auto: Vice City features in-game radio commercials referring to Red Dawn as a documentary.
DLC for the video game Fallout: New Vegas includes "WOLVERINES!" spray painted on a wall in an abandoned high school as an Easter egg. This is only available if the player character has the "Wild Wasteland" trait.

 Red Dawn Emails 
In the wake of the COVID-19 pandemic, a string of emails by Trump administration officials detailing concerns about the government's response to COVID-19 was dubbed the "Red Dawn emails" in reference to the film.

 Ukrainian resistance during the 2022 Russian invasion 

During the 2022 Russian invasion of Ukraine, several Russian armored vehicles destroyed by the Ukrainians appeared with the word "Wolverines" spray-painted in white, a clear reference to the film. One theory is that numerically the Ukrainian are outnumbered by the Russians, similar to the scenario depicted in the film. It is not known whether "Wolverines" was painted by civilians or soldiers, but it has been spotted in Kyiv.

 Remake 

A remake of Red Dawn'' directed by Dan Bradley was released in 2012. The film takes place in the 2010s, with North Korea invading the United States. Milius criticized the remake as "terrible" after reading an original script where the villains were Chinese:
"There was a strange feeling to the whole thing. They were fans of the movie so they put in stuff they thought was neat. It's all about neat action scenes, and has nothing to do with story. ... There's only one example in 4,000 years of Chinese territorial adventurism, and that was in 1979, when they invaded Vietnam, and to put it mildly they got their [butts] handed to them ... Why would China want us? They sell us stuff. We're a market. I would have done it about Mexico."

See also 

 Culture during the Cold War
 Survival film
 World War III in popular culture

References

Further reading

External links 

 
 
 
 
 
 
 Original script "Ten Soldiers" by Kevin Reynolds

1984 films
1984 action films
1980s adventure films
1980s English-language films
1980s war films
American action films
American anti-communist propaganda films
American coming-of-age films
Cold War films
1980s political films
War adventure films
Films scored by Basil Poledouris
Films directed by John Milius
Films with screenplays by John Milius
Films set in Colorado
Films shot in New Mexico
Films about the United States Air Force
United Artists films
Films about World War III
Fiction about invasions
Metro-Goldwyn-Mayer films
Films produced by Buzz Feitshans
Guerrilla warfare in film
1980s American films